The International Chess Federation (FIDE) governs international chess competition. Each month, FIDE publishes the lists "Top 100 Players", "Top 100 Women", "Top 100 Juniors" and "Top 100 Girls" rankings of countries according to the average rating of their top 10 players and top 10 female players. The Elo rating system is used.

Top players

The top 20 players were ranked on 1 March 2023 as follows:

Top women

The top 20 female players were ranked on 1 January 2023 as follows:

Top juniors

Juniors are considered to be players who will remain under the age of 21 years for the duration of the current calendar year.

The top 20 juniors were ranked on 1 January 2023 as follows:

Top girls

Girls are considered to be female players who will remain under the age of 21 years for the duration of the current calendar year.

The top 20 girls were ranked on 1 January 2023 as follows:

Top federations
Every month, FIDE publishes a list ranking federations according to the average rating of their top 10 players. The top 20 federations were ranked as follows on 1 January 2023:

References

External links
 Official FIDE rating lists
 Elo query with world ranking list and historical development since 1990

Chess rating systems
Sports world rankings